Richard P. McWilliam (October 20, 1953 – January 5, 2013) was the chairman and co-founder of Upper Deck Company, a successful and award-winning Carlsbad-based collectibles business that specializes in trading cards for Major League Baseball, National Basketball Association, National Hockey League, National Football League and Major League Soccer. Before McWilliam was involved with the Upper Deck Company, he was a Cal State Fullerton graduate and former certified public accountant.

Besides Upper Deck, McWilliam had another business, JetSource, of which he was founder and CEO. JetSource was voted one of the top 40 fixed-base operations for jet-setters in America among the thousands of such airport rest stops for fuel, private hangars and other services.

Upper Deck
In 1993, McWilliam controlled Upper Deck with a 27 percent stake, and was the only original partner still active in company management.

In May 2005, Richard McWilliam was honored at the sports collectible industry's annual trade convention in Hawaii as the industry's "most influential" person of the past 20 years. In addition to McWilliam's award, Upper Deck was also recognized for the debut of its legendary 1989 Baseball trading card set designed and produced by Robert Young Pelton. Author Pete William's book Card Sharks covers the rise and fall of Upper Deck and McWilliam's ousting of the founders and designer who built the company from a start up to $260 million in annual sales in the first three years. McWilliam's decision to counterfeit  error cards is also documented in the book. In 2010, a New York Post article detailed McWilliam's role in the scandal.

Personal
McWilliam had a wife named Vivianne, and they have three children. An enthusiastic fisherman, he was a financial supporter of the trout-stocking program in Bishop, California, supporting programs at Rady Children's Hospital in San Diego, and programs for military veterans. McWilliam died in Rancho Santa Fe, California on January 5, 2013, due to unknown causes. He had a history of heart problems, including open heart surgery in 2008.

References

	

1953 births
Place of birth missing
2013 deaths
American chief executives
American sports businesspeople
California State University, Fullerton alumni
Servite High School alumni
20th-century American philanthropists